The Modern Art Gallery of Palermo (Italian: Galleria d'Arte Moderna Palermo) is a civic art gallery of Palermo, displaying works from the 19th until the early 20th century, located on Via Sant'Anna #21, adjacent to the church of Sant'Anna la Misericordia in the ancient quarter of the Kalsa of the city of Palermo, region of Sicily, Italy. The collections were moved to this site, consisting of the former Franciscan convent associated with Sant'Anna and the adjacent Palazzo Bonet.

History
The Teatro Politeama on Piazza Ruggero Settimo, just north of the central Palermo was completed by the late 19th-century, and to lure more visitors and create a cultural landmark, a painting and sculptor gallery, named after its initial patron, Empedocle Restivo, was installed in 1910 in the second floor foyer featuring mainly local contemporary talent. In 2006, it was decided to move the enlarging collection to a more central space, and the city had available the large former Franciscan convent near the church of Sant'Anna, and it adjacent former Palazzo Bonet, a former 15th century residence.

The palazzo Bonet had been erected circa 1480 by the Catalan merchant Gaspare Bonet. In 1618, his family sold the palace to the Franciscans who made it part of their monastery. In the 18th-century, earthquakes damaged the building, and refurbishments were made by the monastery. In the 19th-century, part of the Convent was converted to apartments. In the 1866, the convent was suppressed, and parts were used for a school. Starting in 1996, the Municipality  funded the refurbishment, creating more than 1,300 square meters of exhibition spaces, and rooms for educational activities, conference halls, library, archives, bookshop and cafeteria. The converision of the building into a museum was carried out by Tonino Martelli and Roberto Termini, with Alessandra Raso, Stefano Testa and Matteo Raso of the Cliostraat company adding to the planning for a museum. In 2006, the collection was moved from the Politeama here. The entrance and exhibition spaces are mainly housed in the former site of Palazzo Bonet.

The gallery houses works of important artists like Giovanni Boldini, Massimo Campigli, Carlo Carrà, Felice Casorati, Eustachio Catalano, Giorgio de Chirico, Ettore De Maria Bergler, Emilio Greco, Renato Guttuso, Nino Franchina, Lia Pasqualino Noto, Antonino Leto, Salvatore Lo Forte, Francesco Lo Jacono, Vincenzo Ragusa, Pippo Rizzo, Mario Rutelli, Aleardo Terzi, Onofrio Tomaselli, Mario Sironi, Franz von Stuck and Elisa Maria Boglino.

Collections 

 Erulo Eroli (Roma 1854 – 1916)
 The Sicilian Vespers, 1890–1891, oil on canvas, cm 297 × 495
 Guglielmo De Sanctis (Roma 1829 – 1911)
 Donna Olimpia Pamphili and Innocent X with a Cardinal, 1891 circa, oil on canvas, cm 232 × 310 

 Giuseppe Patania (Palermo 1780 – 1852)
 Self-Portrait as a Young Man, 1807, oil on canvas, cm 82,5 × 63
 Self-Portrait, 1820 circa, oil on canvas, cm 56 × 43,5
 Portrait of a boy with a dog, 1830, oil on canvas, cm 51 × 42,7
 Portrait of a girl with a dove, 1830, oil on canvas, cm 51 × 41,5
 Portrait of an Old Priest, 1838, oil on canvas, cm 63,5 × 52
 Venus and Adonis, 1828, oil on canvas, cm 75 × 100
 Jupiter Kisses Io, 1828, oil on canvas, cm 75 × 100
 Danae and the Shower of Gold, 1829, oil on canvas, cm 75,5 × 101
 The Rape of Europa, 1828–1829, oil on canvas, cm 75 × 100
 Danae and the Shower of Gold, 1839, oil on canvas, cm 75,5 × 101
 The Flight of the White Queen, 1850, oil on canvas, cm 30,5 × 37
 Mercury Taking the Infant Bacchus to Heaven, 1829, oil on canvas, cm 75 × 100,5
Odorico Politi (Udine 1785 – Venice 1846)
 Portrait of a Family, 1809–1812, oil on canvas, cm 73 × 60,4 

Salvatore Lo Forte (Palermo 1807 – 1885)
 Portrait of Michele Pintacuda, 1855 circa, oil on canvas, cm 71 × 56,5
 Portrait of signora Pintacuda, 1855 circa, oil on canvas, cm 70,5 × 56,5
 Portrait of a Young Gentleman, 1835-1845 circa, oil on canvas, cm 36, 7 × 23,5
 Portrait of Giuseppe Garibaldi, 1870 circa, oil on canvas, cm 62 × 40 
 Portrait of Giuseppe Garibaldi, 1860, oil on panel, cm 73 × 58,5
 Benedetto Civiletti (Palermo 1845 – 1899)
 Puttini, 1865 circa, gesso, cm 100 × 65 × 65
 Vincenzo Riolo (Palermo 1772 – 1837)
 Psyche Transported by Zephyrs, 1829, oil on canvas, cm 76 × 60
 Orlando Furioso, 1800-1810 circa, oil on canvas, cm 36 × 30
 Giuseppe By Giovanni (Palermo 1817 – 1898)
 Aeneas and Dido, 1865 circa, oil on canvas, cm 52 × 65,5 

 Andrea D'Antoni (Palermo 1811 – 1868)
 Sleeping Venus, 1840 circa, oil on canvas, cm 103 × 154 
 Valerio Villareale (Palermo 1773 – 1854)
 Dancing Bacchante, 1838, marble, h cm 210 by 
 Benedetto Delisi (Palermo 1831 – 1875)
 Christopher Columbus in Chains, 1872, marble, cm 65 × 34 × 60  
 Giuseppe Garibaldi on Horseback, 1884 circa, bronze, cm 91 × 75 × 34
 Francesco Padovano (Palermo 1842 - documentato a Palermo fino al 1915)
 The Night of 19 July 1812 in Palermo, or the Renunciation of Sicilian Feudalism (The Abolition of 'Fidecommesso'), 1874, oil on canvas, cm 197 × 268
 Filippo Liardo (Leonforte 1834 – Asnières 1917)
 Garibaldian Burial, 1862–1864, oil on canvas, cm 248 × 171
 Onofrio Tomaselli (Bagheria 1866 – Palermo 1956)

 The Miner Boys (I Carusi), circa 1905, oil on canvas, cm 184 × 333,5 
 A Life, 1900 circa, oil on canvas, cm 71 × 141
 Reminiscence, 1899 circa, pastel on card, cm. 85 × 73
 Portrait of Francesco Lojacono, 1930 circa, oil on canvas, cm 50,5 × 44
 Archimede Campini (Forlì 1884 – Palermo 1950)
 Bust of Francesco Lojacono, 1920 circa, gesso, cm 77 × 66 × 44 

 Francesco Lojacono (Palermo 1838 – 1915)
 View of Monte Catalfano, 1865-1870 circa, oil on canvas, cm 45 × 109
 Wind on the Mountain, 1872, oil on canvas, cm 106 × 134,5
 Alti pascoli, 1894-1896 circa, oil on canvas, cm 46 × 84,3
 A Small Rock, 1900-1914 circa, oil on canvas, cm 57 × 137
 View of Palermo, 1875, oil on canvas, cm 78 × 156 
 Rocks (The Rock), 1895–1905, oil on canvas, cm 84 × 46
 Mareggiata, 1900-1914 circa, oil on panel, cm 21 × 39,5
 Backwash at Sea, 1909 circa, oil on panel, cm 24 × 34
 Monte San Giuliano, 1875-1880 circa, oil on canvas, cm 75 × 42,2
 Marina (Marina with a Ship), 1880-1890 circa, oil on canvas, cm 33,5 × 97,5
 Bathtub with Leaves (Bathtub with capelvenere and alocasia), 1897 circa, oil on canvas, cm 41,7 × 70,5
 Study of a Swamp, 1905-1910 circa, oil on canvas, cm 57 × 110
 Autumn (Autumn on the Anapo), 1907 circa, oil on canvas, cm 138 × 238
 Eustachio Catalano
 In a Garden, 1938 circa, oil on panel, cm 79 x 61,4

Gallery

References

Art museums and galleries in Palermo
Museums in Palermo
Modern art museums in Italy
Art museums established in 1910
1910 establishments in Italy